The Music Hall was a concert venue in Hanover, Germany. It was located in the "U-boat hall" on the former Hanomag complex. The structure was originally built in 1943 as a submarine production facility in the northern shipyard of Kriegsmarinewerft Wilhelmshaven. Notable performers included Rush, Sting, Roxette, David Bowie, and Phish. The structure is now a furniture store.

References

Music venues in Germany
Former music venues in Germany
Buildings and structures in Hanover